3 Feet Smaller is an Austrian punk rock band formed in 2000. 

Their first big concert was at the 2 Days a Week festival in Wiesen in 2001. The first single of their debut album was in the Austrian alternative charts for many weeks. Their second single topped the charts in East Switzerland.

Over the years they have played many concerts in Austria and other European countries. They also played as support for other bands like The Offspring and Die Ärzte. They released five albums, a Christmas CD, and an EP. The band also appeared on the soundtrack of the movie Dead in 3 Days and the skiing video game Freak Out: Extreme Freeride. 

After the end of "3 Feet Smaller'", three former members of the band later reformed under the title "Lian" and released a self-titled new album in June 2016. Lead vocalist Marcus Smaller has pursued a solo career with two albums.

Members

Current lineup
 Marcus Smaller – lead vocals, guitar (2000–present)
 Roberto Franko – drums (2000–present)
 The General  – bass (2008–present), bass / guitar (2004–2006)

Former members
 El Howdy – bass (2005–2008)
 Dipmaster – guitar (2000–2005)
 Schorsch Zwiebelmayer – bass (2000–2004)

Discography

Albums

 2001: Damn, We Need a Title for This Record
 2002: Insert Album Title Here: .....
 2004: 3rd Strike
 2009: December 32
 2011: 3 Feet Smaller

EP
 2002: One Night Stand

Other
 2000: A Very Special Christmas Day (Christmas-CD)
 2001: What About You, Me and a Horse (online mini album)
 2005: Five Years of Bowling Punk (lve DVD)

References

External links
Interview from Diepresse.com (German)
Review of 3 Feet Smaller by Musikreviews.de

Austrian punk rock groups